Herelleviridae is a family of bacterial viruses of the order Caudovirales infecting members of the phylum Firmicutes.  The family has five subfamilies, 33 genera and 92 species.


Etymology
The family's name, Herelle is in honor of Félix d'Hérelle, a French-Canadian microbiologist, the suffix -viridae is the standard suffix for virus families.

Taxonomy

The following subfamilies and genera are assigned to Herelleviridae (-virinae denotes subfamily and -virus denotes genus):
 Bastillevirinae
 Agatevirus
 Bastillevirus
 Bequatrovirus
 Caeruleovirus
 Eldridgevirus
 Goettingenvirus
 Grisebachstrassevirus
 Jeonjuvirus
 Matervirus
 Moonbeamvirus
 Nitunavirus
 Shalavirus
 Siophivirus
 Tsarbombavirus
 Wphvirus
 Brockvirinae
 Kochikohdavirus
 Schiekvirus
 Jasinkavirinae
 Pecentumvirus
 Spounavirinae
 Okubovirus
 Siminovitchvirus
 Twortvirinae
 Baoshanvirus
 Kayvirus
 Sciuriunavirus
 Sepunavirus
 Silviavirus
 Twortvirus

The following genera are unassigned to a subfamily:
 Elpedvirus
 Harbinvirus
 Hopescreekvirus
 Mooreparkvirus
 Salchichonvirus
 Tybeckvirus
 Watanabevirus

Lastly, the species Brochothrix virus A9 is unassigned to a subfamily and genus.

References

 
Virus families